Koziegłowy  is a large village in the administrative district of Gmina Czerwonak, within Poznań County, Greater Poland Voivodeship, in west-central Poland. It adjoins Czerwonak to the north and the city of Poznań to the south. It is one of the 2 villages in Poland with a population of at least 90

In 2006 Koziegłowy had 10,755 inhabitants, which makes it one of the most populous villages in Poland (in second place behind Kozy).

Koziegłowy lies on the main road from Poznań to Wągrowiec, and consists mainly of modern residential developments situated to the east of that road. To the west is the Warta River and the main sewage treatment plant for the city of Poznań.

Translated directly, the name means "Goats' Heads".

References

Villages in Poznań County